Winston Méndez Montero (born November 20, 1974) is a Dominican boxer who won Bronze at the PanAm Games 2007 by losing his semi to Luis Yáñez: 6:14. He had defeated Oscar Negrete previously.

He won against Odilion Zaleta and Yampier Hernández in the second Olympic qualifier. He lost the final to Paulo Carvalho, although this did not affect his qualification.

External links
Qualifier
Winston Montero's profile at NBC Olympics

1974 births
Living people
Light-flyweight boxers
Boxers at the 2007 Pan American Games
Boxers at the 2008 Summer Olympics
Olympic boxers of the Dominican Republic
Dominican Republic male boxers
Pan American Games bronze medalists for the Dominican Republic
Pan American Games medalists in boxing
Medalists at the 2007 Pan American Games
20th-century Dominican Republic people
21st-century Dominican Republic people